Harpalus paratus is a species of ground beetle in the subfamily Harpalinae. It was described by Casey in 1924.

References

paratus
Beetles described in 1924